I'll Sell My Life is a 1941 American crime film directed by Elmer Clifton and starring Rose Hobart, Michael Whalen and  Joan Woodbury.

Cast
 Rose Hobart as 	Dale Layden 
 Michael Whalen as 	Mordecai Breen
 Stanley Fields as Bochini
 Joan Woodbury as 	Valencia Duncan
 Roscoe Ates as 	Happy Hogan
 Richard Bond as 	Albert Darnell
 Ben Taggart as 	Police Lt. Hammer
 Robert Regent as Philip Leyden
 Paul Maxey as 	Grady
 Munro Brown as 	Freddie
 Robert Walker as	Lugger
 Eduardo Durant as 	Eddie, Orchestra Leader
 Frances Morris as 	Annie Winterbottom

References

Bibliography
 Fetrow, Alan G. Feature Films, 1940-1949: a United States Filmography. McFarland, 1994.

External links
 

1941 films
1941 crime films
1940s English-language films
American crime films
Films directed by Elmer Clifton
American black-and-white films
1940s American films